Wightwick is an English surname and may refer to

George Wightwick (1802–1872), a British architect 
Richard Wightwick (c. 1547–1629), an English clergyman, co-founder of Pembroke College, Oxford

English toponymic surnames